Norman Batton Bulaich (born December 25, 1946) is an American former professional football player who was a running back in the National Football League (NFL).

Professional career
After playing college football at Texas Christian University, Bulaich was drafted in the first round (18th overall) in the 1970 NFL Draft by the Baltimore Colts, for whom he wore number 36.

The 6'1", 217-pound running back/fullback held the Colts single-game rushing record, 198 yards against the New York Jets on September 19, 1971, until the 2000 season when Edgerrin James broke the record by rushing for 219 yards.  Later in that 1971 season, Bulaich was named to the AFC Pro Bowl squad. He was also featured on the cover of the November 8, 1971 issue of Sports Illustrated. He was traded from the Colts to the Philadelphia Eagles for a 1973 fourth-round selection (83rd overall–Kansas defensive end Gery Palmer) and a 1974 second-round pick (37th overall–Ed Shuttlesworth) on January 29, 1973.

In 120 career games with the Colts (1970–72), Eagles (1973–74) and Miami Dolphins (1975–79), Bulaich rushed for 3,362 yards and 30 touchdowns with a 4.1 rushing average.  He also made 224 receptions for 1,766 yards and 11 touchdowns.

Bulaich currently lives in Hurst, Texas and worked as an executive for IESI-BFC Ltd., a waste management company, in Haltom City, Texas.

References

1946 births
Living people
American people of Serbian descent
American football running backs
TCU Horned Frogs football players
Baltimore Colts players
Philadelphia Eagles players
Miami Dolphins players
American Conference Pro Bowl players
Players of American football from Texas
Sportspeople from Galveston, Texas
People from Hurst, Texas